Vishnyakovo is a rural locality (a village) in Kurilovskoye Rural Settlement, Sobinsky District, Vladimir Oblast, Russia. The population was 5 as of 2010. There are 2 streets.

Geography 
Vishnyakovo is located on the Vorsha River, 14 km north of Sobinka (the district's administrative centre) by road. Koroyedovo is the nearest rural locality.

References 

Rural localities in Sobinsky District